Christina Jensen  (born 21 January 1974) was a female Danish football goalkeeper.

She was part of the Denmark women's national football team at the 1996 Summer Olympics, but did not play.
She participated in the 1999 FIFA Women's World Cup.

See also
 Denmark at the 1996 Summer Olympics

References

External links
 
http://www.soccerpunter.com/players/292366-Christina-Jensen
https://web.archive.org/web/20110111025213/http://soccertimes.com/usteams/1998/games/jul25.htm

1974 births
Living people
Danish women's footballers
Place of birth missing (living people)
Footballers at the 1996 Summer Olympics
Olympic footballers of Denmark
Women's association football goalkeepers
Denmark women's international footballers
1999 FIFA Women's World Cup players